The 2019 NCAA Division I men's soccer season was the 61st season of NCAA championship men's college soccer.  The regular season began on August 30, 2019 and continued into the third weekend of November 2019. The season culminated with the four-team College Cup at WakeMed Soccer Park in Cary, North Carolina, December 13–15, 2019. A total of 206 men's soccer teams played in Division I during this season. The Georgetown Hoyas won their first NCAA title, defeating the Virginia Cavaliers 7–6 on penalty kicks following a 3–3 draw after.two extra time periods.

Changes from 2018

Coaching changes

New programs 
The Merrimack Warriors began the transition from Division II to Division I, joining the Northeast Conference.

Long Island University announced in October 2018 that its two current athletic programs—the Division I LIU Brooklyn Blackbirds and the Division II LIU Post Pioneers—would merge into a single Division I athletic program under the LIU name after the 2018–19 school year. The unified program, which maintains LIU Brooklyn's Division I and Northeast Conference memberships, announced its new nickname of Sharks on May 15, 2019. With both campuses having sponsored men's soccer, the two teams became a single LIU team based at the Post campus in Nassau County, New York in the 2019 season.

Rebranded programs
In addition to LIU, one other Division I men's soccer program assumed a new athletic identity during the 2018–19 offseason. On July 1, 2019, the University of Missouri–Kansas City (UMKC) announced that its athletic program, previously known as the UMKC Kangaroos, would henceforth be known as the Kansas City Roos.

Upcoming programs
Three schools that sponsor men's soccer began transitions from Division II in the 2020–21 school year. Bellarmine will join the ASUN Conference, Dixie State will join the Western Athletic Conference, and UC San Diego will join the Big West Conference.

Discontinued programs 

Despite the program's many successes, the University of New Mexico's Board of Regents voted, for economic reasons, to discontinue the men's soccer program and three other sports teams at the conclusion of their 2018–19 seasons.

Conference realignment 

This was also the final season for four schools in their then-current conferences. The Cal State Bakersfield Roadrunners and Kansas City Roos both left their then-current home of the Western Athletic Conference, with the Roadrunners joining the Big West Conference and the Roos returning to the Summit League in July 2020. The Purdue Fort Wayne Mastodons left the Summit League for the Horizon League. The UConn Huskies left the American Athletic Conference to join several of their former conference mates in the Big East Conference.

Season outlook

Preseason polls

Regular season

#1

Standings

Major upsets 
In this list, a "major upset" is defined as a game won by a team ranked 10 or more spots lower or an unranked team that defeats a team ranked #15 or higher.

All rankings are from the United Soccer Coaches Poll.

Early season tournaments 
Several universities hosted early season soccer tournaments.

Top Drawer Soccer Team of the Week 
 Bold denotes TDS player of the week.

College Soccer News Team of the Week 
 Bold denotes College Soccer News player of the week.

Postseason

Conference winners and tournaments 

 * = Ineligible, in transition from DII

Postseason awards

Hermann Trophy 

The Hermann Trophy is given to the year's most outstanding player. The finalists were announced on December 12. On January 4, 2020, Robbie Robinson of Clemson won the Hermann Trophy.

 Joe Bell – Virginia
 Dylan Nealis – Georgetown
 Robbie Robinson – Clemson

TDS National Player of the Year 

The TopDrawerSoccer.com National Player of the Year Award recognizes the top college soccer player in the nation by the TDS staff. On December 23, 2019, Joe Bell of Virginia won the award.
 Joe Bell – Virginia

Senior CLASS Award 

 The Senior CLASS Award is presented each year to the most outstanding senior in NCAA Division I. Elliot Panicco of Charlotte won the award. The following finalists were:
 Tanner Beason (DF), Stanford
 Gideon Betz (DF), Campbell
 Drake Callender (GK), California
 Anders Engebretsen (FW), Saint Mary's (CA)
 Dayonn Harris (FW), UConn
 Cal Jennings (FW), UCF
 Garrett McLaughlin (FW), SMU
 Elliot Panicco (GK), Charlotte
 Mauricio Pineda (MF), North Carolina
 Jack Skahan (MF), North Carolina

All-Americans

Conference player and coaches of the year

Other major awards 
 United Soccer Coaches College Coach of the Year: Brian Wiese, Georgetown
 Bill Jeffrey Award: Steve Clements, Tyler Junior College
 Glenn Myernick Award:
 Jerry Yeagley Award: Ann Murphy, Saint Louis
 Mike Berticelli Award: Roy Dunshee, Washington College
 NCAA Division I Men's Soccer Tournament Most Outstanding Player:
 Offensive: Daryl Dike, Virginia
 Defensive: Dylan Nealis, Georgetown
 TopDrawerSoccer.com National Freshman of the Year Award: Aidan Morris, Indiana

Final rankings

Statistics

Individuals
As of January 22, 202001/22---Well after the end of the season, the NCAA Goals Against Average stats are still incomplete & incorrect...

Last update on  p1/22

Last update on 01/22 01/22---Well after the end of the season, the NCAA Save Percentage stats are still incomplete & incorrect...

Last update on 01/22 

Last update on 01/2201/22---Well after the end of the season, the NCAA's Total Saves stats still lack games played data...

Last update on  01/22
 Individual statistics are through the games of December 15, 2019

Teams
Last update on 01/24Last update on  01/24
Last update on 01/24

Team statistics are through the games of December 15, 2019Last update on 01/24

See also 
 College soccer
 List of NCAA Division I men's soccer programs
 2019 in American soccer
 2019 NCAA Division I Men's Soccer Tournament
 2019 NCAA Division I women's soccer season

References 

 
NCAA